David Higgins (before 1760 – April 1783) was a ship's captain, merchant, early settler and political figure on St John's Island (later Prince Edward Island).

Higgins was captain of a fishing boat operating in the Gulf of Saint Lawrence during the 1760s. With two other merchants, he acquired Lot 59 on St John's Island in 1767. He formed a partnership with James William Montgomery, Scotland's lord advocate, to develop this property. Higgins was one of the first members of the Legislative Council but was dismissed in 1773 for lack of attendance. In 1773, he married Elizabeth, the daughter of Boston merchant Job Prince. Higgins operated a store at Georgetown, built a sawmill and gristmill and settled a number of tenants on his property. He was elected to the Legislative Assembly of Prince Edward Island and was chosen as speaker in 1779 but resigned in March of the following year.

After experiencing financial losses and losing his property, his business and finally his wife, Higgins began drinking heavily and contracted a fever that led to his death in Charlottetown in 1783.

External links 
 

1783 deaths
Speakers of the Legislative Assembly of Prince Edward Island
Sea captains
Year of birth uncertain
Year of birth unknown
Members of the Legislative Council of Prince Edward Island
Colony of Prince Edward Island people